Zsolt Huszárik (born 4 August 1989 in Szeged) is a professional Hungarian footballer currently plays for BKV Előre SC.

Career
In the summer 2013, Huszárik joined Austrian club USC Mank. He played there until January 2014, where he joined another Austrian club, FC Gratkorn.

References

External links
 HLSZ 
 
 

1989 births
Living people
Sportspeople from Szeged
Hungarian footballers
Association football midfielders
Makó FC footballers
MTK Budapest FC players
Tisza Volán SC footballers
Vasas SC players
Rákospalotai EAC footballers
FC Gratkorn players
SZEOL SC players
Dunaújváros PASE players
FC Tatabánya players
Mosonmagyaróvári TE 1904 footballers
III. Kerületi TUE footballers
BKV Előre SC footballers
Nemzeti Bajnokság I players
Nemzeti Bajnokság II players
Hungarian expatriate footballers
Expatriate footballers in Austria
Hungarian expatriate sportspeople in Austria